Yan Aung Lin (born 3 March 1993) is a footballer from Burma, and a goalkeeper for Myanmar national football team and the Myanmar U-22 football team. In November 2015, he transferred to Yadanarbon FC.

Honours
Champion : 2016 Myanmar National League

References
Yan Aung Lin FB
Yadanarbon pages

1993 births
Living people
Burmese footballers
Myanmar international footballers
Association football goalkeepers
Yadanarbon F.C. players
Sportspeople from Yangon